Kantipur (from kanti light, pur city) was a medieval kingdom in the Malla confederacy of Nepal. The name of the kingdom was derived from the Sanskrit name of its capital city, now known as Kathmandu.

History
The kingdom started after king Jayayakshya Malla divided his kingdom so that his sons could be the rulers of their own kingdom. After its formation, the kingdom replaced Bhaktapur as the main trading center.

See also
Kathmandu Metropolitan City
Kathmandu District
Kathmandu Valley

References

1826 disestablishments
States and territories established in 1484
Malla dynasty
Newar
Former countries in South Asia
Empires and kingdoms of Nepal
15th-century establishments in Nepal